Colleen Frakes is an American comics writer and artist. 

Originally from Olympia, Washington, Frakes is an alumna of The Evergreen State College and the Center for Cartoon Studies.

Awards and recognition 

 In 2007, Frakes's book Tragic Relief was awarded a grant from the Xeric Foundation.
 In 2009, Frakes's book Woman King won an Ignatz Award's Promising New Talent award.

References

External links 
 Tragic Relief
 Iron Scars

American female comics artists
Evergreen State College alumni
People from Olympia, Washington
American comics writers
Year of birth missing (living people)
Living people

Center for Cartoon Studies alumni